is a passenger railway station in located in the city of  Fukuchiyama, Kyoto Prefecture, Japan, operated by the private railway company Willer Trains (Kyoto Tango Railway).

Lines
Maki Station is a station of the Miyafuku Line, and is located 5.2 kilometers from the terminus of the line at Fukuchiyama Station.

Station layout
The station consists of two opposed side platforms on an embankment. The station is unattended. The use of wye switches charges passing trains the speed limit of 40 km/h. There is no station building except for shelters on the platforms.

Adjacent stations

History
The station was opened on 16 July 1988.

Passenger statistics
In fiscal 2018, the station was used by an average of 14 passengers daily.

Surrounding area
Japan National Route 9
Japan National Route 175
Yura River

See also
List of railway stations in Japan

References

External links

Official home page 

Railway stations in Kyoto Prefecture
Railway stations in Japan opened in 1988
Fukuchiyama, Kyoto